Anelosimus linda is a species of spider in the family Theridiidae. The holotype and paratype specimens were collected in Cameron Highlands, Pahang, Malaysia. Both specimens are female; this species currently lack information on males. The spider is named for Linda Wendel, the mother of the discoverer, Ingi Agnarsson. A. linda lives in mid-elevation forest; both the holotype and paratype were collected at 1550m elevation.

References

Theridiidae
Spiders of Oceania
Spiders described in 2006